Highway 777 is a provincial highway in the Canadian province of Saskatchewan. It runs from Highway 41 at Alvena to Highway 6 near Naicam.

Highway 777 passes through communities of Cudworth, Middle Lake, and Lake Lenore.

Major intersections

See also 
Roads in Saskatchewan
Transportation in Saskatchewan

References 

777